Multiple terrorist attacks have occurred in Greece.

Banned terrorist organizations

Nihilist Faction

The Nihilist Faction was a nihilist anarchist organization in Greece, which claimed responsibility for a 28 May 1996 bombing of IBM offices in Athens. The attack caused extensive structural damage but no injuries. The group was responsible for other attacks, primarily arson and fire bombing. The group was founded c. 1996.

Revolutionary People's Struggle

Revolutionary Organization 17 November

N17 was a Greek far-left Marxist–Leninist urban guerrilla organization formed in 1975. The Greek government arrested many members of the 17 November organization in the summer of 2002. In 2003 15 members were found guilty of multiple murders and convicted for more than 2,500 crimes.

Revolutionary Struggle

The Revolutionary Struggle is a far-left Greek paramilitary group known for its attacks on Greek government buildings. It is widely described as a terrorist organization by both the Greek government and the media.

Revolutionary Nuclei

Revolutionary Nuclei (RN) was, anti-U.S., anti-NATO, and anti-European Union urban guerrilla organization that conducted 13 bomb attacks in Athens between 1996 and 2000. The first attack for which RN took credit was a bomb attack on Greek Coast Guard installations in Piraeus on 11 May 1997, but it later acknowledged that two earlier attacks were carried out by RN members. Per its four proclamations, RN fought against the "imperialist domination, exploitation, and oppression" of Greece.

On 27 April 1999 an RN bomb targeting a conference at the InterContinental Hotel in Athens killed one person (Despite telephoned warnings, the building was not evacuated). In December 1999 RN set off explosives near Texaco's offices in Athens.

Conspiracy of Fire Nuclei

Sect of Revolutionaries

Revolutionary Self-Defense

The Revolutionary Self-Defense group claims to fight to "construct a mass internationalist revolutionary movement, by strengthening militant resistance on the entire spectrum of class antagonism".
On November 10, 2016 a police officer, who had been on guard outside the embassy, was wounded when unknown assailants threw a hand grenade on the French embassy building, days later the group claimed responsibility for the attack. Militants shot against members of the riot police when they are parked in the downtown in Athens, Greece. The incidents left no one injured.
The group is suspected of a 2016 grenade attack the Russian embassy in Athens.

Black Star
Black Star (also known as Mavro Asteri) is a Greek anarchist urban guerrilla group involved in violent direct action.

During the period between May 1999 and October 2002, Black Star was one of the most active anarchist groups in Greece. They describe themselves as anti-imperialist, anti-establishment, and anti-capitalist. The group has declared itself to be dedicated to "resistance against the mass organizations of US imperialism and to their local collaborators." They believe that "the only terrorists are the US imperialist forces, their European allies, and their local capitalist associates."

Outlawed groups
As Greece is a member of the European Union, the following terrorist entities that are outlawed in Greek territory via the EU Terrorist list:
 Al-Qaeda
 Islamic State of Iraq and the Levant (ISIL/Daesh)
 Hezbollah (military wing only)
 Hamas (including the military wing Izz ad-Din al-Qassam Brigades)
 Palestinian Islamic Jihad
 Kurdistan Workers' Party

Timeline

See also
Terrorism in the European Union

References

 
Greece
Human rights abuses in Greece